Gilla in Choimded Ó Cerbailláin (died 1279), also known in Latin as Germanus, was a medieval Irish bishop.

Ó Cerbailláin was elected Bishop of Cinél nEógain  in 1230. In 1254 he transferred the See from Ráith Lúraig (Maghera) to Derry.

References

People from County Londonderry
13th-century Roman Catholic bishops in Ireland
Bishops of Cinél nEógain
Bishops of Derry
1279 deaths